North of the Yukon is a 1939 American Western film directed by Sam Nelson and starring Charles Starrett.

Plot
In this North western, a brave Canadian Mountie pursuing a gang of fur thieves finds himself drummed out of the RCMP and forced to run a gauntlet of Mountie whips. when the gang learns of this, they convince him to join them.

Cast
 Charles Starrett as RCMP Sgt. Jim Cameron
 Dorothy Comingore as Jean Duncan (as Linda Winters)
 Bob Nolan as RCMP Const. Bob Cameron
 Sons of the Pioneers as Musicians
 Paul Sutton as Pierre Ledoux
 Richard Fiske as Mart Duncan
 Vernon Steele as RCMP Insp. Wylie
 Edmund Cobb as RCMP Cpl. Hawley
 Tom London as Carter
 Lane Chandler as Atkins
 Dick Botiller as Henchman Barton
 Kenne Duncan as Henchman Meeker (as Kenneth Duncan)
 Harry Cording as MacGregor

Reception 
The performances and plot of North of the Yukon received a positive review in Variety. Boxoffice called it "a fair to middling western."

See also
 List of American films of 1939

References

External links
 
 

1939 films
Columbia Pictures films
American adventure films
American Western (genre) films
1937 Western (genre) films
1937 adventure films
Films directed by Sam Nelson
1930s English-language films
1930s American films